Mikael Blomberg (born 23 October 1974) is a retired Swedish football midfielder.

He has played for IFK Norrköping and Kalmar FF. After his retirement from top-tier football he played for Lindö FF and Hargs BK.

References

1974 births
Living people
Swedish footballers
IFK Norrköping players
Kalmar FF players
Association football midfielders
Allsvenskan players
Superettan players
People from Nyköping Municipality
Sportspeople from Södermanland County